Naomi Broady was the defending champion, but she lost in the final to Tatjana Maria, 6–4, 6–7(6–8), 6–4.

Seeds

Main draw

Finals

Top half

Bottom half

External links
 Main draw

Dow Tennis Classic - Singles